Ann Eva Margareta Melander (born 18 June 1961 in Lund) is a Swedish former alpine skier who competed in the 1980 and 1984 Winter Olympics.

External links
 sports-reference.com
 

1961 births
Swedish female alpine skiers
Alpine skiers at the 1980 Winter Olympics
Alpine skiers at the 1984 Winter Olympics
Olympic alpine skiers of Sweden
Sportspeople from Lund
Living people
20th-century Swedish women